MCpl (ret.) Jody Mitic CD (born January 3, 1977) is a Canadian politician and retired soldier. He served as an Ottawa City Councillor, representing Innes Ward in Ottawa's east end, from 2014 until 2018.

Background
Mitic was born in Kitchener, Ontario.

Mitic served in the Canadian Army as a sniper. He lost both of his legs in a landmine incident while fighting in the War in Afghanistan in 2007.

During his recovery, Mitic worked through some of his psychological issues with a computer program named Ellie, which tracks facial expressions and speech patterns to diagnose post-traumatic stress disorder and depression.

As part of his physical rehabilitation, Mitic successfully recovered and ran in an Achilles Canada 5-km run with prosthetic legs. In 2013, he and his brother Cory competed on The Amazing Race Canada 1, finishing in 2nd place. Following his appearance on The Amazing Race Canada, Mitic became a motivational speaker and an advocate for wounded veterans and people with disabilities. In 2016, he appeared on the Trailer Park Boys podcast episode 15 to talk about his book, Unflinching: The Making of a Canadian Sniper.

Politics

Mitic was elected following the departure of long-time city councillor Rainer Bloess. He won with close to one third of the vote, about 1,800 votes ahead of his nearest competitor, Laura Dudas.

During the 2017 Conservative Party leadership contest, Mitic contributed to former Minister of Veterans Affairs Erin O'Toole's campaign.

Mitic announced on March 31, 2018, that he would not be running for re-election, citing wanting to spend more time with his family, and both mental and physical health issues. After months of absenteeism, Ottawa City Council voted June 13, 2018 to authorize an indefinite leave of absence for him, as the body had done in 2013 to facilitate Councillor Stephen Blais' recovery from a heart attack.

Personal life

Mitic is engaged to his current girlfriend Kelley Shields. He separated from his former wife, Alannah Gilmore. He has two daughters with his ex-wife. Gilmore had been one of the medics who treated him after his injury in Afghanistan. Mitic wrote a book about his experience in Afghanistan in a memoir titled  Unflinching: The Making of a Canadian Sniper.

Shields and Mitic were engaged in January 2019.

Election results

References

External links
Campaign Biography
City Council Biography

1977 births
Living people
Canadian Army soldiers
Canadian military snipers
Canadian military personnel of the War in Afghanistan (2001–2021)
Canadian amputees
The Amazing Race Canada contestants
Ottawa city councillors
Writers from Ottawa
Writers from Kitchener, Ontario
Canadian people of Serbian descent
Canadian politicians with disabilities
Canadian memoirists
Canadian male non-fiction writers